A work order is usually a task or a job for a customer, that can be scheduled or assigned to someone. Such an order may be from a customer request or created internally within the organization. Work orders may also be created as follow ups to inspections or audits.  A work order may be for products or services.

A work order should include the following: 
 Requestor
 Date of request
 Request details
 Location
 Preferred completion date
 Priority level
 Work approved by
 Description of completed work
 Work completed by
 Date of completion

In a manufacturing environment, a work order is converted from a sales order to show that work is about to begin on the manufacture, building or engineering of the products  requested by the customer. In a service environment, a work order can be equivalent to a service order where the WO records the location, date and time the service is carried out and the nature of work that is done. The type of personnel (e.g. job position) may also be listed on the WO. A rate (e.g. $/hr, $/week) and also the total number of hours worked and total value is also shown on the work order.

A work order may be a maintenance or repair request from students, faculty or staff in a university.

Orders received from outside an organization are often dispatched (reviewed and scheduled) before being executed. Work orders may be for preventive maintenance

Contractors may use a single job work order and invoice form that contains the customer information, describes the work performed, lists charges for material and labor, and can be given to the customer as an invoice.

A job order is an internal document extensively used by projects-based, manufacturing, building and fabrication businesses. A job order may be for products and/or services. In a manufacturing environment, a job order is used to signal the start of a manufacturing process and will most probably be linked to a bill of material. Hence, the job order will probably state:

the quantity of the product to be manufactured, built or fabricated
the amount of raw material to be used, its price and amount
the types of labour required, rate (per hour or per unit) and amount
the machine utilisation for each machine during the routing process, its rate and amount

In a service environment, a job order cannot be the equivalent to a work or service order where the job order records the location, date and time the service is carried out and the nature of service that was carried out, the work order does not. The type of personnel (e.g. job position) may also be listed on the job order. A rate (e.g. $/hr, $/week) and also the total number of hours worked and total value is also shown.

See also
 Corrective work order
 Maintenance, repair and operations
 Order fulfillment
 Order management system
 Sales order
 Stop tag

References

Supply chain management